A cabana boy is a male attendant who serves the guests of a hotel or large private estate, operating from a nearby cabaña (American Spanish for cabin; compare cabin boy, a similar occupation aboard ships during the age of sail), often on a beach. A pool boy or pool attendant performs the same duties at a swimming pool. 
Duties may include: working with towels, swimsuits, robes, blankets, bathing caps, soap, umbrellas, beach chairs, launder, and may serve refreshments.

Notable cabana boys in fiction

Literature
in the 1974 novel Montauk by the Swiss writer Max Frisch

Motion pictures
Jeffrey Willis in The Flamingo Kid
Enrique Salvatore in Legally Blonde
 Alan Riply  in Forever Mine

Video games
in The Curse of Monkey Island and The Siege of Plunder
a single mission in Hitman: Blood Money, set in Del Mar, California

Television
 Brad Carlton in The Young and the Restless
 Cabana Boy (also known as Pool Boy) in MADtv'''s recurring skit "Cabana Chat" played by Bryan Callen
 John Cherland and Kirk Porter in Crowned: The Mother of All Pageants Sean (Dustin Clare) in Satisfaction Chandler Bing (Matthew Perry) in Friends Ramon (Carlos Jacott) in Seinfeld Zak (Paul Michael Robinson) in Sabrina, the Teenage Witch Brandon Walsh (Jason Priestley) in Beverly Hills, 90210 Bart Simpson in The Simpsons'' was once described by his sister Lisa Simpson as "the devil's cabana boy."

See also
Butler
Page (servant)
Groom (profession)
Valet

References

External links
"ON THE JOB: The former president's pool boy", Chris Colin, SF Gate, September 24, 2007

Personal care and service occupations
Domestic workers